Plácido Fernández Viagas (29 March 1924 in Tangier – 8 December 1982 in Madrid) was a Spanish politician and judge, member of the Spanish Socialist Workers' Party of Andalusia, who was President of the pre-autonomous government of Andalusia between 1978 and 1979.

Biography 
He was born on March 29, 1924 in Tangier, this city being administered by a treaty that made it an International Zone. He studied his bachelor's degree at the Sacred Heart School in Tangier and his law degree at the University of Seville. He married Elisa Bartolomé, having 11 children. He practiced the judiciary in several cities, in Nador, La Palma, Tenerife and, in the Andalusian provinces of Cadiz, Huelva, Granada and Seville, where until April 1977 he was a judge in the litigation chamber of his Territorial Court.

He was a member of Justicia Democrática, a clandestine group of civil servants who fought against the Franco regime from within, as well as of Coordinación Democrática en Andalucía. He was suspended from his duties as a judge for a few months in 1976 for participating in a demonstration in favour of amnesty for political prisoners.

References

1924 births
1982 deaths
Spanish Socialist Workers' Party politicians
Presidents of the Regional Government of Andalusia